Schizothorax longibarbus is a species of ray-finned fish in the genus Schizothorax.

References 

Schizothorax
Fish described in 1936